Mtwara Airport  is an airport in southern Tanzania serving the town of Mtwara.

Location
The coordinates of Mtwara Airport are 10°20'10.0"S, 40°10'55.0"E (Latitude:-10.336111; Longitude:40.181944).

Overview
The Mtwara non-directional beacon (Ident: MT) is located on the field.

Airlines and destinations

Accidents and incidents 
27 August 1975: Douglas C-47B 5Y-AAF of East African Airways was damaged beyond economic repair in a landing accident. The aircraft was on a scheduled passenger flight. All 19 people on board survived.

See also

 List of airports in Tanzania
 Transport in Tanzania

References

External links

FallingRain - Mtwara Airport
OpenStreetMap - Mtwara
OurAirports - Mtwara

Airports in Tanzania
Mtwara Region
Buildings and structures in the Mtwara Region